Rebecca Peake (born 22 June 1983) is an English female athlete who competed in the women's shot put. She has a personal best distance of 16.76 metres.

Athletics career
Peake competed at the 2010 Commonwealth Games in Delhi, India finishing 5th.

She also won a silver medal at the UK Indoor National Championships in 2010 and another silver medal at the UK Outdoor National Championships in 2011.

Other achievements
Academically, Peake has achieved a Professional Doctorate in Sports Management.

References

1983 births
Living people
British female shot putters
Athletes (track and field) at the 2010 Commonwealth Games
Place of birth missing (living people)
Commonwealth Games competitors for England